Hans Kirschstein (1896-1918) was a German First World War fighter ace credited with 27 confirmed aerial victories. Flying combat with Jagdstaffel 6 of the Imperial German Air Service, he shot down 26 enemy airplanes and an observation balloon between March and June 1918.

The victory list

Hans Kirschstein's victories are reported in chronological order, which is not necessarily the order or dates the victories were confirmed by headquarters.

This list is complete for entries, though obviously not for all details. Background data was abstracted from Above the Lines: The Aces and Fighter Units of the German Air Service, Naval Air Service and Flanders Marine Corps, 1914–1918, pp. 142–143; and The Aerodrome webpage on Hans Kirschstein . Added facts are individually cited. Abbreviations were expanded by the editor creating this list.

Endnotes

References
 
 

Aerial victories of Kirschstein, Hans
Kirschstein, Hans